
Gmina Odolanów is an urban-rural gmina (administrative district) in Ostrów Wielkopolski County, Greater Poland Voivodeship, in west-central Poland.

The gmina contains part of the protected area called Barycz Valley Landscape Park.

Villages
Apart from the town of Odolanów, Gmina Odolanów contains the villages and settlements of Baby, Biadaszki, Boników, Garki, Gliśnica, Gorzyce Małe, Grochowiska, Huta, Kaczory, Kuroch, Lipiny, Nabyszyce, Nadstawki, Papiernia, Raczyce, Świeca, Tarchały Małe, Tarchały Wielkie, Trzcieliny, Uciechów, Wierzbno and Wisławka.

Neighbouring gminas
Gmina Odolanów is bordered by the town of Sulmierzyce and by the gminas of Milicz, Ostrów Wielkopolski, Przygodzice and Sośnie.

References
Polish official population figures 2006

Odolanow
Ostrów Wielkopolski County